Palmer House is a Hilton hotel in downtown Chicago, Illinois.

Palmer House may also refer to:

in the United Kingdom
 Palmer House, Great Torrington, an 18th-century house in Devon

in the United States (by state then city)
 Palmer House (Blackton, Arkansas), listed on the National Register of Historic Places in Monroe County, Arkansas
 E. Payne Palmer House, listed on the National Register of Historic Places in Phoenix, Arizona
 A. Z. Palmer House, Taylor, Arizona, listed on the NRHP in Navajo County, Arizona
 Jordan Palmer House, Taylor, Arizona, listed on the NRHP in Navajo County, Arizona
 Judge Augustus C. Palmer House, Calistoga, California, listed on the NRHP in Napa County, California
 Annie Palmer House, Point Arena, California, listed on the NRHP in Mendocino County, California
 Minnie Hill Palmer House, Chatsworth, California, listed on the NRHP in Los Angeles, California
 Palmer Hall (Colorado Springs, Colorado), listed on the NRHP in El Paso County, Colorado
 Hezekiah Palmer House, Branford, Connecticut, listed on the NRHP in New Haven County, Connecticut
 Isaac Palmer House, Branford, Connecticut, listed on the NRHP in New Haven County, Connecticut
John Palmer House (Lisbon, Connecticut), listed on the NRHP in New London County, Connecticut
 Capt. Nathaniel B. Palmer House, Stonington, Connecticut, listed on the NRHP in New London County, Connecticut
 Amos Palmer House (Stonington, Connecticut), Stonington, Connecticut, listed on the NRHP in New London County, Connecticut
 Palmer Home, Dover, Delaware, listed on the NRHP in Kent County, Delaware
John Denham Palmer House, Fernandia Beach, Florida, listed on the NRHP in Nassau County, Florida
 Palmer-Perkins House, Monticello, Florida, listed on the NRHP in Jefferson County, Florida
 Palmer House (Monticello, Florida), Monticello, Florida, listed on the NRHP in Jefferson County, Florida
 Palmer House, Atlanta, Georgia, demolished 2011, was on listed on the NRHP in Fulton County, Georgia
 B. J. Palmer House, Davenport, Iowa, listed on the NRHP in Scott County, Iowa
 Hiram Palmer House, Farmington, Illinois, listed on the NRHP in Fulton County, Illinois
 Col. Gustavius A. Palmer House, Crystal Lake, Illinois, listed on the NRHP in McHenry County, Illinois
 Dana-Palmer House, Cambridge, Massachusetts, listed on the NRHP in Middlesex County, Massachusetts
 Dorsey-Palmer House, Hagerstown, Maryland, listed on the NRHP in Washington County, Maryland
 William B. and Mary Shuford Palmer House, Ann Arbor, Michigan, listed on the NRHP in Washtenaw County, Michigan
 George W. Palmer House, Chelsea, Michigan, listed on the NRHP in Washtenaw County, Michigan
 Charles Palmer House, Imlay City, Michigan, listed on the NRHP in Lapeer County, Michigan
 Lorenzo Palmer and Ruth Wells House, Hudson, Michigan, listed on the NRHP in Lenawee County, Michigan
 Albert Palmer House, Owosso, Michigan, listed on the NRHP in Shiawassee County, Michigan
 Myrick-Palmer House, Pontiac, Michigan, listed on the NRHP in Oakland County, Michigan
 The Palmer House (Sauk Centre), listed on the NRHP in Stearns County, Minnesota
 Lindamood Building of Palmer Home for Children, Columbus, Mississippi, listed on the NRHP in Lowndes County, Mississippi
 Palmer-Marsh House, Bath, North Carolina, a National Historic Landmark and listed on the NRHP in Beaufort County, North Carolina
 Palmer-Lewis Estate, Bedford, New York, listed on the NRHP in Westchester County, New York
 Palmer House (Northfield Center, Ohio), listed on the NRHP in Summit County, Ohio
 Palmer House (Dayton, Oregon), listed on the NRHP in Yamhill County, Oregon
John Palmer House (Portland, Oregon), listed on the NRHP in Multnomah County, Oregon
 Amos Palmer House (Langhorne, Pennsylvania), Langhorne, Pennsylvania, National Register of Historic Places listings in Bucks County, Pennsylvania
 Palmer-Northrup House, North Kingstown, Rhode Island, listed on the NRHP in Washington County, Rhode Island
 Arnold-Palmer House, Providence, Rhode Island, listed on the NRHP in Providence County, Rhode Island
 W. E. Palmer House, Henning, Tennessee, also known as Alex Haley House and Museum, NRHP-listed and a Tennessee state historic site in Lauderdale County, Tennessee.
 Gen. Joseph B. Palmer House, Murfreesboro, Tennessee, listed on the NRHP in Rutherford County, Tennessee
 Thomas H. Palmer House, Pittsford, Vermont, listed on the NRHP in Rutland County, Vermont
 Charles R. Palmer House, Burlington, Vermont, listed on the NRHP in Chittenden County, Vermont
 Amiss-Palmer House, Blacksburg, Virginia, listed on the NRHP in Montgomery County, Virginia
 O. K. Palmer House, Chehalis, Washington, listed on the NRHP in Lewis County, Washington
 Palmer Brother's Octagons, listed on the NRHP near West Salem, Wisconsin

See also
John Palmer House (disambiguation)